The East Germany women's national artistic gymnastics team represented East Germany in FIG international competitions.

History
Shortly after World War II Germany was split into East Germany and West Germany.  For many years East and West Germany had competed as a Unified Team.  East Germany made their World Championships debut in 1962 and their Olympic debut in 1968.

Team competition results

Olympic Games
 1968 —  Bronze medal
Maritta Bauerschmidt, Karin Janz, Marianne Noack, Magdalena Schmidt, Ute Starke, Erika Zuchold
 1972 —  Silver medal
Irene Abel, Angelika Hellmann, Karin Janz, Richarda Schmeisser, Christine Schmitt, Erika Zuchold
 1976 –  Bronze medal
Carola Dombeck, Gitta Escher, Kerstin Gerschau, Angelika Hellmann, Marion Kische, Steffi Kräker
 1980 –  Bronze medal
Maxi Gnauck, Silvia Hindorff, Steffi Kräker, Katharina Rensch, Karola Sube, Birgit Süss
 1984 – did not participate due to boycott 
 1988 –  Bronze medal
Gabriele Fähnrich, Martina Jentsch, Dagmar Kersten, Ulrike Klotz, Bettina Schieferdecker, Dörte Thümmler

World Championships
 1962 – 5th place

 1966 – 4th place

 1970 –  silver medal
Angelika Hellmann, Karin Janz, Marianne Noack, Richarda Schmeißer, Christine Schmitt, Erika Zuchold
 1974 –  silver medal
Angelika Hellmann, Annelore Zinke, Richarda Schmeißer, Bärbel Röhrich, Heike Gerisch, Irene Abel
 1979 –  bronze medal
Maxi Gnauck, Regina Grabolle, Silvia Hindorff, Steffi Kräker, Katharina Rensch, Karola Sube
 1981 –  bronze medal
Steffi Kräker, Annett Lindner, Birgit Senff, Kerstin Jacobs, Franka Voigt, Maxi Gnauck
 1983 –  bronze medal
Maxi Gnauck, Gabriele Fähnrich, Astrid Heese, Diana Morawe, Silvia Rau, Bettina Schieferdecker
 1985 –  bronze medal
Gabriele Fähnrich, Jana Fuhrmann, Martina Jentsch, Dagmar Kersten, Ulrike Klotz, Jana Vogel 
 1987 –  bronze medal
Dörte Thümmler, Ulrike Klotz, Martina Jentsch, Klaudia Rapp, Astrid Heese, Gabriele Fähnrich

Most decorated gymnasts
This list includes all East German female artistic gymnasts who have won at least four medals at the Olympic Games and the World Artistic Gymnastics Championships combined.  This list does not includes medals won as a unified Germany.  Also not included are medals won at the 1984 Friendship Games (alternative Olympics).

Hall of Famers 
The following East German gymnasts have been inducted into the International Gymnastics Hall of Fame:
 Maxi Gnauck (2000)
 Karin Büttner-Janz (2003)
 Erika Zuchold (2005)
 Steffi Kräker (2011)

References

National women's artistic gymnastics teams
Gymnastics